Shorea faguetioides is a tree in the family Dipterocarpaceae, native to Borneo. The specific epithet faguetioides refers to its similarity to Shorea faguetiana.

Description
The flaky, cracked bark is greyish tan-coloured.

Distribution and habitat
Shorea faguetioides is endemic to Borneo.

Conservation
Shorea faguetioides has been assessed as near threatened on the IUCN Red List. It is threatened by conversion of land for agriculture and mining. It is also threatened by logging, sometimes for its timber. In Kalimantan, fires are an increasing threat. The species is found in some protected areas in Malaysian Borneo.

References

faguetioides
Endemic flora of Borneo
Plants described in 1962